Peter Griffiths  (born September 1862) was a Welsh international footballer. He was part of the Wales national football team between 1884 and 1891, playing 6 matches. He played his first match on 9 February 1884 against Ireland and his last match on 7 February 1891 against Ireland.

See also
 List of Wales international footballers (alphabetical)

References

1862 births
Place of birth missing
Date of death missing
Year of death missing
Welsh footballers
Wales international footballers
Association footballers not categorized by position